Market Street Cinema was a historical theater located on Market Street in the Mid-Market district, San Francisco, California. It was founded in 1912 by David and Sid Grauman as the Imperial Theater. It was converted into a movie theatre as the Premiere Theatre (1929) and the United Artists Theatre (1931).

The benefit world premiere of Dirty Harry was held here on December 22, 1971.

In 1972 it was renamed Market Street Cinema and was used through the early 2000s as an adult entertainment venue. The role of the theater in San Francisco's sex industry in the 1980s was documented in a photo essay by photographer Leon Mostovoy. In October 2015, the San Francisco Planning Commission approved a plan to demolish the theatre and replace it with an eight-story building.

Market Street Cinema is considered haunted in popular culture: it features in a 2013 episode of Ghost Adventures (season 7, episode 25) and was used as a shooting location by filmmaker Charles Webb for a low-budget horror movie called G-String Horror.

On August 15, 2016, Mint Minx Press published the novella Market Street Cinema by author Michele Machado, narrating the fictional account of a dancer working at the club in 1998.

See also
 List of strip clubs
 Mitchell Brothers O'Farrell Theatre

References

External links 
 Market Street Cinema, Cinema Treasures
 

Theatres in San Francisco
Cinemas and movie theaters in the San Francisco Bay Area
Market Street (San Francisco)
Sex industry in San Francisco
Strip clubs in the United States